The 2005–06 Pittsburgh Panthers men's basketball team represented the University of Pittsburgh in the 2005–06 NCAA Division I men's basketball season. Led by head coach Jamie Dixon, the Panthers finished with a record of 25–8 and made it to the second round of the 2006 NCAA Division I men's basketball tournament.

References

Pittsburgh Panthers men's basketball seasons
Pittsburgh
Pittsburgh
Pittsburgh Pan
Pittsburgh Pan